Judith Kuring (born 23 November 1948) known Jude Kuring  is an Australian actress who appeared in theatre, film and television during the late 1970s and early 80s. She remains best known for her stint as the recurring character of petty criminal Noeline Bourke in the soap opera Prisoner in 1979 until 1980.

Her film roles include The Singer and the Dancer, Journey Among Women, Newsfront, The Journalist, ...Maybe This Time and Prisoner Queen.

Career

Theatre

Kuring started her career in theatre in the late 1960sjoined the Australian Performing Group (APG) in Melbourne during the early 1970s and starred alongside Max Gillies, Graeme Blundell, Bruce Spence and others in a number of plays, variety shows and other stage productions written by David Williamson and Jack Hibberd.

She continued performing with the APG and, in 1972, she became involved in an oppositional subgroup of the APG which also included, among others, Micky Allen, Claire Dobbin, Kerry Dwyer, Laurel Frank, Evelyn Krape and Yvonne Marini. The group held its first show, Betty Can Jump, later that year.

Television and film
Although making her first appearance on the police drama Homicide in 1971, Kuring would not begin television acting for another four years until being cast in a minor role in the 1975 television movie They Don't Clap Losers. During the next few years, she was seen on the television series Alvin Purple as well as playing various characters on comedy shows including Wollongong the Brave.

In 1977, Kuring made her film debut in The Singer and the Dancer as Mrs Herbert, the nagging daughter of Mrs Bilson (Ruth Cracknell). Later that year, she appeared in her breakout role as Grace in the cult film Journey Among Women. She had supporting roles in Newsfront and The Journalist

Prisoner: Cell Block H
She was subsequently cast as Noeline Bourke in the soap opera Prisoner.

Noeline was largely portrayed as a lower class thief and the head of a small family of petty thieves, Bourke was introduced to the series as an inmate emerging to fight Monica Ferguson (Lesley Baker) for position of "top dog" while Bea Smith (Val Lehman) is recovering in hospital. One of the subplots during the first and second seasons of the series focused on her criminal family, and in one episode, her dimwitted brother Col is killed by police during a hostage situation. Her character was released shortly after, however she was again caught breaking into a warehouse with her daughter Leanne and returned to Wentworth where she served another brief stint.  

Taking time off from the series, Kuring appeared in the 1980 film Maybe This Time for which she was nominated for Best Actress in a Supporting Role by the Australian Film Institute.

Kuring reappeared on the series, her character being reintroduced shortly after the death of her daughter Leanne, who had been killed during a protest at the prison. After being accepted into the prison's work release program, she is coerced to help one of the employees, Kay White (Sandy Gore), by using her family to steal fabric from the factory. She is set up by White however and, with the work release canceled, she is transferred to Barnhurst (another prison) for her own protection.

Post-Prisoner

In 1981, she and Chris Westwood formed a women's subgroup in the APG. The two had been discussing the lack of women's roles in Australian theater, often relegated to the stereotypical "hooker with a heart of gold", or as a mother, and began organizing members at Nimrod Theatre. They were also given a $110,000 Limited Life Project grant from the Theatre Board of the Australian Council, which they used for a variety of projects including two sets of play readings, a series of acting workshops and included hosting a seminar on women, comedy and music.

After guest appearing on Waterloo Station in 1983, Kuring subsequently moved away from acting.

Return to acting
Kuring after a long tenure away from acting, once more returned to her former career in 2013 to play a prominent role in the movie Prisoner Queen, which centered on an obsessed fan of the Prisoner television series.

In 1995, Jude featured in the pilot of an LGBTQI+ sitcom called Buck House, playing the lead role of Phyllis Buck. Originally filmed before a live studio audience at the Australian Film, Television & Radio School, Buck House underwent considerable rewrites following its initial popularity.  A new 8-episode series was created for streaming on the internet in 1997.  That series and the 1995 pilot starring Jude Kuring can be viewed on https://aussiegaysitcom.com

In 2013, she appeared in film The House Cleaner and 2017 7 from Etheria

Filmography

References

External links
 
 Jude Kuring at Pramfactory.com

Living people
Australian stage actresses
Australian film actresses
1948 births
Australian soap opera actresses
20th-century Australian actresses
21st-century Australian actresses